James David Campbell Walker (born 25 August 1968) is a British rower and subsequently climate change campaigner. He won a bronze medal in the Men's Eight event at the 1989 World Rowing Championships and competed for Great Britain in the same boat class at the 1992 Summer Olympics and the 1996 Summer Olympics. He was also a trialist for the British team for the 2000 Summer Olympics. During his rowing career he competed for clubs including King's School, Chester,  University of London Boat Club, and Molesey Boat Club. He went on to co-found the international climate change organization The Climate Group in 2004 and is currently a Senior Director at the international sustainable energy initiative Sustainable Energy for All.

References

External links
 

1968 births
Living people
British male rowers
Olympic rowers of Great Britain
Rowers at the 1992 Summer Olympics
Rowers at the 1996 Summer Olympics
Sportspeople from Chester